Johan Örtegren (born 22 March 1978) is a former professional tennis player from Sweden.

Career
Örtegren made his ATP singles main draw debut at the 1999 Swedish Open as a qualifier, losing to world number 52 and fifth seed Christian Ruud of Norway in the first round. He also qualified for the 2000 Stockholm Open and after beating Fredrik Jonsson he lost to Sebastien Grosjean, the tournament sixth seed and world number 20, in the second round. He has the dubious honour of losing a match 6–0, 6–0, 6–0 when he was beaten by Todd Woodbridge at the 2001 Wimbledon qualifying tournament.

Örtegren played mostly on the Futures circuit reaching five finals and winning three titles. He also won two ITF doubles titles. Örtegren has a career high ATP singles ranking of 295 achieved on 6 August 2001. He also has a career high ATP doubles ranking of 479 achieved on 29 January 2001.

After his retirement as a professional player, Örtegren took up coaching. He also joined the coaching staff at the Good to Great Tennis Academy in Sweden, which is run by ex-touring pros Magnus Norman, Nicklas Kulti, and Mikael Tillström. As a coach he assisted touring pros such as Grigor Dimitrov and Laura Robson.

ITF Futures Titles

Singles: (3)

Doubles: (2)

References

External links

1978 births
Living people
Swedish male tennis players
Tennis players from Stockholm
Swedish tennis coaches